Giorgia Bronzini (born 3 August 1983) is an Italian former professional racing cyclist, who rode professionally between 2003 and 2017. She won the women's road race in the UCI Road World Championships in both 2010 and 2011 and the women's points race in the UCI Track Cycling World Championships in 2009.

Born in Piacenza, Bronzini took a total of 80 victories on the road and the track, including stages of the Giro d'Italia Femminile, La Route de France, the Tour of Qatar, the Tour of California, and the Tour of Chongming Island. After a 16-year career, in August 2018 Bronzini announced that she would retire at the end of the season and become a directeur sportif with Trek Bicycle Corporation's new women's team,  in 2019. She remained with the team until the end of the 2021 season, when she joined  in a similar role.

Major results

Track

2001
 1st  Points race, UEC European Junior Track Championships
 1st  Points race, UCI Juniors Track World Championships
2002
 2nd Points race, UEC European Under-23 Track Championships
2003
 UEC European Under-23 Track Championships
1st  Points race
3rd Scratch
2005
 2nd Points race, UEC European Under-23 Track Championships
2009
 UCI Track Cycling World Championships
1st  Points race
4th Scratch
 2009–10 UCI Track Cycling World Cup Classics
1st Points race, Melbourne
1st Points race, Cali
2nd Scratch, Melbourne
2nd Scratch, Cali
 1st Points race, 2008–09 UCI Track Cycling World Ranking
2010
 1st Points race, 2009–10 UCI Track Cycling World Ranking
 3rd Points race, 2009–10 UCI Track Cycling World Cup Classics, Beijing
2011
 1st Points race, 2010–11 UCI Track Cycling World Ranking
 2nd Scratch, National Track Championships
2013
 National Track Championships
1st  Keirin
2nd Sprint
2nd Team sprint
 3rd Points race, UCI Track Cycling World Championships
2014
 1st Points race, International Track Women & Men
 International Belgian Open
1st Scratch
3rd Points race
 3rd Points race, Revolution – Round 2, Manchester
2015
 1st Points race, 6 giorni delle rose - Fiorenzuola
2017
 Belgian International Track Meeting
2nd Scratch
3rd Points race

Road

2001
 5th Road race, UCI Junior Road World Championships
2003
 3rd GP Carnevale d'Europa
2004
 1st Stage 1 Damesronde van Drenthe
 Eko Tour Dookola Polski
1st Stages 1, 2 & 4
 1st Stage 6 Holland Ladies Tour
 4th GP Liberazione
 10th Rotterdam Tour
2005
 1st Giro del Lago Maggiore
 1st Giro del Friuli
 1st Rund um die Nürnberger Altstadt
 Giro del Trentino Alto Adige-Südtirol
1st Stages 1 & 3
 Giro d'Italia Femminile
1st Stages 3, 6 & 9
 Giro della Toscana Int. Femminile – Memorial Michela Fanini
1st Stages 3a & 5
 3rd GP Liberazione
 5th Tour of Flanders for Women
 6th Road race, UCI Road World Championships
2006
 1st Stage 2b Giro della Toscana Int. Femminile – Memorial Michela Fanini
 1st  Points classification Holland Ladies Tour
 2nd Trofeo Riviera Della Versilia
 2nd GP de Plouay – Bretagne
 3rd Rund um die Nürnberger Altstadt
 6th Overall Trophée d'Or Féminin
1st Stage 2
2007
 1st Grand Prix de Dottignies
 1st Novilon Internationale Damesronde van Drenthe
 1st GP Liberazione
 1st Stage 1 Giro d'Italia Femminile
 1st Stage 4a Giro della Toscana Int. Femminile – Memorial Michela Fanini
 Tour de PEI
1st Stages 3 & 5
 2nd Trofeo Alfredo Binda-Comune di Cittiglio
 3rd Road race, UCI Road World Championships
 3rd Road race, National Road Championships
 3rd Overall Trophée d'Or Féminin
1st Stages 3 & 6
 3rd Drentse 8 van Dwingeloo
 5th GP de Plouay – Bretagne
 8th Ronde van Drenthe
 10th Overall Tour du Grand Montréal
2008
 1st Züri-Metzgete
 1st Stage 7 La Route de France
 3rd Road race, National Road Championships
 3rd GP Liberazione
 4th Grand Prix de Dottignies
 5th Overall Trophée d'Or Féminin
1st Stages 1, 2, 3 & 4
 9th Overall Tour de Pologne Feminin
1st Stages 2 & 3
2009
 1st Overall Gran Caracol de Pista
1st Stages 1, 2, 4, 8 & 9
 1st GP Carnevale d'Europa
 1st GP Liberazione
 Tour de PEI
1st Stages 1, 3 & 4
 1st Stage 2 Giro della Toscana Int. Femminile – Memorial Michela Fanini
 2nd Overall Ladies Tour of Qatar
1st Stages 1 & 3
 3rd Road race, Mediterranean Games
 3rd Road race, National Road Championships
2010
 1st  Road race, UCI Road World Championships
 1st GP Carnevale d'Europa
 Giro della Toscana Int. Femminile – Memorial Michela Fanini
1st Stages 2 & 6
 2nd Overall Ladies Tour of Qatar
1st Stage 2
 2nd Grand Prix de Dottignies
 2nd GP Liberazione
 3rd Ronde van Drenthe
 4th Drentse 8 van Dwingeloo
 5th GP Ciudad de Valladolid
2011
 1st  Road race, UCI Road World Championships
 1st GP Liberazione
 1st Grand Prix Cycliste de Gatineau
 1st Liberty Classic
 3rd Ronde van Drenthe
 3rd GP Carnevale d'Europa
 4th Ronde van Gelderland
 6th Drentse 8 van Dwingeloo
 8th Sparkassen Giro
 9th Overall Ladies Tour of Qatar
 9th Tour of Chongming Island World Cup
 10th Overall Holland Ladies Tour
2012
 Giro della Toscana Int. Femminile – Memorial Michela Fanini
1st Stages 1 & 4
 2nd Drentse 8 van Dwingeloo
 3rd Liberty Classic
 4th Ronde van Drenthe
 4th Classica Citta di Padova
 5th Road race, Olympic Games
 9th Overall Trophée d'Or Féminin
1st Stages 4, 5 & 6
 10th Overall Holland Ladies Tour
2013
 1st Overall Tour of Zhoushan Island
1st Stage 1
 1st Classica Citta di Padova
 1st Knokke-Heist – Bredene
 1st Stage 2 Giro d'Italia Femminile
 La Route de France
1st Stages 1, 2, 3, 4, 5 & 6
 Tour Cycliste Féminin International de l'Ardèche
1st  Points classification
1st Stages 1, 3 & 6
 1st Stage 1 Giro della Toscana Int. Femminile – Memorial Michela Fanini
 2nd Road race, National Road Championships
 2nd Overall Grand Prix Elsy Jacobs
1st Stage 1
 2nd Drentse 8 van Dwingeloo
 2nd Ronde van Gelderland
 2nd Tour of Chongming Island World Cup
 4th Overall Tour of Chongming Island
1st Stage 2
 10th Open de Suède Vårgårda
2014
 1st  Overall Bay Classic Series
1st Stages 1, 3 & 4
 1st Grand Prix de Dottignies
 1st RideLondon Grand Prix
 Tour Cycliste Féminin International de l'Ardèche
1st  Points classification
1st Stages 1, 4 & 6
 1st Stage 2 Giro d'Italia Femminile
 Tour of Zhoushan Island
1st Points classification
1st Stage 3
 2nd Giro del Trentino Alto Adige-Südtirol
 2nd Sparkassen Giro
 3rd Overall Tour of Chongming Island
1st Stage 3
 3rd GP Comune di Cornaredo
 3rd Tour of Chongming Island World Cup
 3rd Giro dell'Emilia Internazionale Donne Elite
 4th Road race, UCI Road World Championships
 4th Overall The Women's Tour
 6th Overall La Route de France
1st Stage 3
 9th Trofeo Alfredo Binda-Comune di Cittiglio
2015
 1st Acht van Westerveld
 1st Tour of Chongming Island World Cup
 La Route de France
1st Stages 2 & 6
 2nd Crescent Women World Cup Vårgårda
 2nd La Madrid Challenge by La Vuelta
 4th Overall Bay Classic Series
1st Stage 4
 4th Overall Tour of Chongming Island
 5th RideLondon Grand Prix
 10th Overall Santos Women's Tour
1st Stage 3
 10th Cadel Evans Great Ocean Road Race
2016
 1st Grand Prix de Dottignies
 1st Stage 3 Emakumeen Euskal Bira
 Giro d'Italia Femminile
1st Stages 1 & 8
 6th Road race, UEC European Road Championships
 10th Trofeo Alfredo Binda-Comune di Cittiglio
2017
 1st Stage 4 Tour of California
 2nd Road race, UEC European Road Championships
 2nd Road race, National Road Championships
 3rd Women's Tour de Yorkshire
 6th Overall Setmana Ciclista Valenciana
 6th Madrid Challenge by La Vuelta
 10th Prudential RideLondon Classique
2018
 1st Stage 2 Madrid Challenge by La Vuelta
 3rd Road race, National Road Championships
 3rd Cadel Evans Great Ocean Road Race
 5th Omloop van het Hageland
 6th Overall Tour of Chongming Island
1st  Points classification
1st Stage 1
 7th Amstel Gold Race
 8th Prudential RideLondon Classique

References

External links
 

1983 births
Living people
Italian female cyclists
Olympic cyclists of Italy
Cyclists at the 2004 Summer Olympics
Cyclists at the 2012 Summer Olympics
Cyclists at the 2016 Summer Olympics
UCI Road World Champions (women)
Sportspeople from Piacenza
UCI Track Cycling World Champions (women)
Cyclists from Emilia-Romagna
Italian track cyclists
Mediterranean Games bronze medalists for Italy
Mediterranean Games medalists in cycling
Competitors at the 2009 Mediterranean Games
Italian LGBT sportspeople
LGBT cyclists
20th-century Italian women
21st-century Italian women